Ashampoo Burning Studio is an optical disc authoring program for Microsoft Windows, developed by Ashampoo.
Current version is 23.

Its main advantage is that it is easy to use. However, that is also its weakness: it does not contain many extras that power users might find useful.

Ashampoo Burning Studio 22 adds support for H.265  decoding.

Ashampoo Burning Studio 23 improves compatibility with Windows 11, adds extensive audiobook module, quick ripping tool, enhanced cover search and more.

It is capable of creating compilations of CDs, DVDs, M-DISCs, Blu-ray discs and disc images. It also allows the creation of DVD movies from video files.

See also
List of optical disc authoring software

References

External links
 Official Website
 Ashampoo Burning Studio Details Page

1999 software
Optical disc authoring software
Shareware
Windows CD/DVD writing software
Windows-only software